Terry Beucher (born February 19, 1937) is an American former athlete. He competed in the men's javelin throw at the 1960 Summer Olympics.

References

External links
 

1937 births
Living people
Athletes (track and field) at the 1960 Summer Olympics
American male javelin throwers
Olympic track and field athletes of the United States
People from Clayton County, Iowa
Track and field athletes from Iowa